Ravensthorpe is a town 541 km south-east of Perth and 40 km inland from the south coast of Western Australia. It is the seat of government of the Shire of Ravensthorpe.

In 1848, the area was surveyed by Surveyor General John Septimus Roe who named many of the geographical features nearby, including the nearby Ravensthorpe Range that the later town was named after.

There was one of the Western Australian Government Railways isolated branch lines between Hopetoun and Ravensthorpe. This line opened in 1909.

Alluvial gold was discovered at the Phillips River in 1892. At the goldfield a de facto town emerged, known as Phillips River. The government completed construction of a copper and gold smelter about 2 km south east of the town in 1906, used to cast copper and gold ingots.

History
A temporary pastoral lease ("Free Run") was registered by James Dunn senior in 1868. His five sons and daughter started sheep farming at the property, Cocanarup (20 km west of the present town), in 1871, after George and John Dunn drove a herd from Albany.

The region is infamous for the Ravensthorpe Massacre, also called the Cocanarup Massacre, where many Noongar people were massacred in revenge for the fatal spearing of John Dunn in 1880. Dunn had allegedly raped a 13 year old Noongar girl.

By 1901, the population had climbed to over 1,000 and the government gazetted the town, renaming it Ravensthorpe. The area continued to prosper and the population grew accordingly, by 1909 the population was over 3000. The prosperity was short-lived; World War I took its toll on the town and by 1918 the local copper smelter had closed and many of the copper and gold mines had closed. The population of the town in 1968 was approximately 800 people.

Agriculture
After the war Ravensthorpe survived servicing the farming in the district. Agriculture in the area began to grow following the Great Depression and pastoral land releases occurred in the 1960s and 1970s. The surrounding areas produce wheat and other cereal crops. The town is a receival site for Cooperative Bulk Handling. A bulk wheat bin was constructed in the town in 1947
capable of holding over 30,000 bushels.

Mining

Nickel

BHP Billiton commenced a feasibility study in 2002 into opening a nickel and cobalt mine and processing plant 35 km East of the town
The project was approved in 2004 and construction commenced shortly afterward. The plant known as the Ravensthorpe Nickel Project was commissioned in late 2007 with first production occurring in October and the first 5000 tonnes being produced by December 2007. The plant was officially opened in 2008.

In January 2009, BHP Billiton announced that it was suspending production at the Ravensthorpe nickel mine indefinitely, due to the reduction in world nickel prices caused by the global economic crisis. The decision cut 1,800 jobs and had a major impact on the local economy.

On 9 December 2009, BHP sold its Raventhorpe mine, on which it had spent A$2.4 billion to build, to Toronto-based First Quantum for US$340 million. First Quantum was one of three bidders for the mine and actually produced the lowest offer. The Canadian company planned to have the mine back in production in mid-2011. In 2017 the mine was put into care and maintenance "due to persistently low nickel prices", but was due to reopen in 2020.

Lithium
It was operated by Galaxy Resources between 2009 and 2012 before being placed on care-and-maintenance in 2013. Mine production restarted on 31 March 2016. In January 2017 the first shipment of 10,000 tonnes of lithium concentrate was consigned from Esperance to Lianyungang, China.

Copper
The Ravensthorpe Copper Mine operated in the area in the 1960s. In 1967 the mine produced  of copper concentrate averaging about 23% Copper. The concentrate was trucked to the port of Esperance for shipment to Japan.

Climate
Ravensthorpe has a semi-arid climate (BSk) with a Mediterranean rainfall pattern.

See also 
 Ravensthorpe Airport
 BHP Billiton Ravensthorpe Nickel Project

References

External links

 Shire of Ravensthorpe

Towns in Western Australia
Mining towns in Western Australia
Great Southern (Western Australia)
Grain receival points of Western Australia
Shire of Ravensthorpe